Oosäär (also known as Oossaar, Oossäär, Kuradisäär) is a small islet in the Gulf of Riga, belonging to Estonia.

Vegetation is sparse and the island is made up largely of rocks and pebbles. Located a short distance off the coast of Lääneranna Parish, Oosäär is administered by Pärnu County.

See also
 List of islands of Estonia

References

External links
Paatsalu Puhkekeskus (in Estonian)
Oosäär at GeoApe.com

Estonian islands in the Baltic
Lääneranna Parish